Karl Schubert (20 May 1908 – 18 March 1991) was a German swimmer who won a silver medal at the 1931 European Aquatics Championships. He also competed at the 1928 Summer Olympics but was eliminated in preliminaries.

References

External links
 

1908 births
1991 deaths
People from Nysa, Poland
Sportspeople from Opole Voivodeship
German male swimmers
Swimmers at the 1928 Summer Olympics
Olympic swimmers of Germany
European Aquatics Championships medalists in swimming
20th-century German people